Dana Alan LeVangie (born August 11, 1969) is an American professional baseball scout and coach, who was the pitching coach for the Boston Red Sox of Major League Baseball (MLB) in  and .

Early years
A native of Whitman, Massachusetts, LeVangie graduated from Whitman-Hanson Regional High School in 1987; he then attended Cape Cod Community College in West Barnstable, Massachusetts (1987–1989), and American International College (AIC) in Springfield, Massachusetts (1989–1991). He was a catcher on the AIC Yellow Jackets baseball team for two seasons (1990–1991). As a senior, he batted .473 with 13 home runs and 87 RBIs, and was named 1991 Division II Northeast Player of the Year. He was selected by the Red Sox in the 14th round of the 1991 MLB draft.

Playing career
LeVangie signed with the Red Sox in June 1991, and played in the Boston farm system through 1996. He mostly played at the Class A-Advanced and Double-A levels, along with eight games in Triple-A. He was a career .196 hitter with seven home runs and 78 RBIs in 351 games played. LeVangie participated in spring training replacement games in 1995, during the 1994–95 MLB strike.

Post-playing career
LeVangie became the bullpen catcher for the 1997 Red Sox, and served in that role for eight years, through the 2004 Red Sox championship season. He then worked as a scout for the Red Sox for eight seasons, serving as a pro scout in 2005 and an advance scout from 2006 through 2012.

In 2013, LeVangie was named to succeed Gary Tuck as bullpen coach for the Red Sox. He held that role until mid-August 2015, when he became interim bench coach for the Red Sox, one of several coaching reassignments caused by manager John Farrell's medical leave of absence for the successful treatment of lymphoma. LeVangie returned to his role as the Red Sox' bullpen coach for the 2016 and 2017 seasons.

LeVangie replaced Carl Willis as Boston pitching coach on November 8, 2017, on the staff of new manager Alex Cora. The first non-pitcher to hold that role for the Red Sox since Mike Roarke in 1994, LeVangie received credit for his contributions to Boston's 108-win  regular season, its American League pennant, and World Series championship. The Red Sox finished third in their league in team earned run average (3.75), then won 11 of 14 post-season games to capture their ninth world title.

On October 8, 2019, the Red Sox announced that LeVangie would not return as the team's pitching coach for the 2020 season, but would stay with the team as a pro scout.

Personal life
LeVangie was inducted to the AIC Yellow Jackets Hall of Fame in 2006. As of November 2017, LeVangie lives in East Bridgewater, Massachusetts, with his wife and two children.

Notes

References

Further reading

External links

 Coaching information from Retrosheet

1969 births
Living people
American International College alumni
Baseball coaches from Massachusetts
Baseball players from Massachusetts
Boston Red Sox coaches
Boston Red Sox scouts
Elmira Pioneers players
Fort Lauderdale Red Sox players
Lynchburg Red Sox players
Major League Baseball bullpen catchers
Major League Baseball bullpen coaches
Major League Baseball pitching coaches
New Britain Red Sox players
Pawtucket Red Sox players
People from Whitman, Massachusetts
Sportspeople from Plymouth County, Massachusetts
Trenton Thunder players
Whitman-Hanson Regional High School alumni
Winter Haven Red Sox players